Liu Ji (Chinese:刘骥; Pinyin: Liú Jì) (born 27 December 1990) is a Chinese football player who currently plays for Guizhou Zhicheng.

Club career
Liu was promoted to Jiangsu Sainty's first team squad in 2009. He didn't have too much chance to play for the first team and was loaned to China League One side Guizhou Zhicheng for half year in July 2011. Liu made 8 appearances in the 2011 League One season, however, Guizhou Zhicheng finished the last place of the league and relegated via League One relegation play-off which lost to Fujian Smart Hero 6-5 in the Penalty shootout.

In February 2014, Liu transferred to Guizhou Zhicheng.

International career
Liu played for China U-17 in the 2006 AFC U-17 Championship.

Career statistics 

Statistics accurate as of match played 16 November 2012

References

1990 births
Living people
People from Guiyang
Chinese footballers
Footballers from Guizhou
Jiangsu F.C. players
Guizhou F.C. players
Chinese Super League players
China League One players
Association football midfielders